The men's shot put at the 2018 Commonwealth Games, as part of the athletics programme, took place in the Carrara Stadium on 8 and 9 April 2018.

Records
Prior to this competition, the existing world and Games records were as follows:

Schedule
The schedule was as follows:

All times are Australian Eastern Standard Time (UTC+10)

Results

Qualifying round
Across two groups, those who threw ≥19.00 m (Q) or at least the 12 best performers (q) advanced to the final.

Final
The medals were determined in the final.

References

Men's shot put
2018